Albert Oguzov (born 28 September 1991) is a Russian judoka.

In 2021, he won one of the bronze medals in his event at the Judo World Masters held in Doha, Qatar.

References

External links
 
 

Living people
Place of birth missing (living people)
Russian male judoka
Universiade medalists in judo
Universiade bronze medalists for Russia
Medalists at the 2015 Summer Universiade
Medalists at the 2017 Summer Universiade
Judoka at the 2019 European Games
European Games competitors for Russia
1991 births
21st-century Russian people